The Pivka is a karst lost river in Slovenia. The Pivka ends in Planina Cave, where it merges with the Rak River and then the Unica River. The confluence of the Pivka and the Rak is one of the largest subterranean confluences in Europe. The Pivka created Postojna Cave, the longest cave system in Slovenia as well as one of its top tourism sites.

References

External links

Rivers of Inner Carniola
Sinking rivers